The Harbour Group, LLC is a Washington D.C. lobbying and public relations firm. It  was founded in 2001 by former Clinton Senior Advisor for Policy and Communications Joel Johnson, who left in 2005 to join the Glover Park Group, and Richard Marcus, who continued to lead it .

The Harbour Group formerly worked with the Alexander Strategy Group to provide access to Washington decision makers, according to ASG's website, before ASG was dissolved in late 2005. The Harbour Group was associated with the Washington law firm Swidler Berlin Shereff Friedman LLP, until February 28, 2006, when that firm merged with Bingham McCutchen LLP.

On September 27, 2001, Belle Haven Consultants, a Hong Kong consulting firm run by Heritage Foundation principals, hired Alexander Strategy Group to represent Malaysian interests. According to U.S. Senate lobbying records, Belle Haven paid ASG US$620,000 over two years "on behalf of unspecified Malaysian business interests seeking to present a positive image of their country in the United States". Belle Haven also paid the Harbour Group, the Western Strategy Group, and a third lobbying firm another $640,000 to represent Malaysian interests at the same time.

References

External links 
 Official website

Public relations companies based in Washington, D.C.
Lobbying firms based in Washington, D.C.
American companies established in 2001